is a railway station on the Isumi Line in Ōtaki, Chiba Prefecture, Japan, operated by the third-sector railway operating company Isumi Railway.

Lines

Station layout

Ōtaki Station has a two opposed side platforms, with the station building connected to Platform 1.

Platforms

Adjacent stations

History
Ōtaki Station opened on April 1, 1930, as the initial terminal station on the Japanese Government Railway (JGR) Kihara Line. After World War II, the JGR became the Japanese National Railways (JNR). Scheduled freight operations were discontinued from October 1, 1974. With the division and privatization of the Japan National Railways on April 1, 1987, the station was acquired by the East Japan Railway Company (JR East). On March 24, 1988, the Kihara Line became the Isumi Railway Isumi Line.

Passenger statistics
In fiscal 2011, the station was used by an average of 380 passengers daily, making it the busiest station on the line.

See also
 List of railway stations in Japan

References

External links

  

Railway stations in Japan opened in 1930
Railway stations in Chiba Prefecture